

This is a list of the National Register of Historic Places listings in Cameron County, Texas.

This is intended to be a complete list of properties and districts listed on the National Register of Historic Places in Cameron County, Texas, United States.  The publicly disclosed locations of National Register properties and districts may be seen in a mapping service provided.  There are 35 properties and districts listed on the National Register in the county, including 4 National Historic Landmarks.  Another property that was formerly listed has been removed.

Current listings

|}

Former listing

|}

See also

National Register of Historic Places listings in Texas
List of National Historic Landmarks in Texas
Recorded Texas Historic Landmarks in Cameron County

References

Registered Historic Places
Cameron County